"Heavy Starry Chain" is the only single released from Tomoko Kawase's alter-ego, Tommy heavenly6 in 2007. It was followed up by her second album Heavy Starry Heavenly. This is Tommy heavenly6's 8th single, and Kawase's 16th overall. The single peaked at #20 on the Oricon singles chart. The limited edition version includes a DVD with the Heavy Starry Chain promotional video.

Music video
The music video features Tommy heavenly6 and her band in a setting that resembles a cooking show. Kawase is dressed as Snow White, with the rest of the band dressed as magicians. At some points in the video the setting is a birthday party, where Kawase is dressed accordingly.

Track listing

References

External links 
 Tommy heavenly6 Official Site
 Scans from Heavy Starry Chain Single

Tomoko Kawase songs
2007 singles
Songs written by Tomoko Kawase
2007 songs
Defstar Records singles